Breaking India: Western Interventions in Dravidian and Dalit Faultlines (Amaryllis, 2011) is a book written by Rajiv Malhotra and Aravindan Neelakandan which argues that India's integrity is being undermined by the support of western institutions for the Dravidian movement and Dalit identity. 

The book has been translated to Tamil, Hindi, and Kannada. In April 2014, a Hindi version of the book titled Bharat Vikhandan was released.

See also 
 Hindu politics

References

External links
 Breaking India (book website)

2011 non-fiction books
Indian non-fiction books
History books about India
Hindu nationalism
21st-century Indian books
Hinduism-related controversies